Lavoriškės Eldership is an eldership in Lithuania, located in Vilnius District Municipality.

Populated places

Ethnic composition 
According to the 2011 census:

 Poles - 81.6%
 Belarusians - 6.5%
 Lithuanians - 5.8%
 Russians - 4.5%

According to the 2021 census, out of 2070 inhabitants:

 Poles - 78.1% (1616)
 Lithuanians - 9.8% (203)
 Belarusians - 5.9% (123)
 Russians - 4.0% (83)

References 

Elderships in Vilnius District Municipality